Social Work in Public Health is a bimonthly peer-reviewed scientific journal covering social work as it relates to public health. It was established in 1989 as the Journal of Health & Social Policy, obtaining its current name in 2007. It is published by Routledge and the editors-in-chief are Marvin Feit (Norfolk State University) and Stanley Battle (University of St. Joseph). According to the Journal Citation Reports, the journal has a 2016 impact factor of 0.604, ranking it 32nd out of 40 journals in the category "Social Work" and 141st out of 145 in the category "Public, Environmental, & Occupational Health".

References

External links

Publications established in 1989
Public health journals
Social work journals
Routledge academic journals
Bimonthly journals
English-language journals